Malacus  may refer to:

 Malacus of Macedonia, winner in the 329 BC Dolichos (race) (Olympic race)
 Astragalus malacus, a species of Astragalus plant

See also
 
 Malakos (disambiguation)